Yusmari Mengana (born 25 October 1993) is a Cuban canoeist. She competed in the women's K-1 200 metres event at the 2016 Summer Olympics. Mengana won three of the five available gold medals in the women's canoe/kayak events at the 2015 Pan American Games in Toronto, Canada.

References

External links
 
 

1993 births
Living people
Cuban female canoeists
Olympic canoeists of Cuba
Canoeists at the 2016 Summer Olympics
Pan American Games medalists in canoeing
Pan American Games gold medalists for Cuba
Canoeists at the 2015 Pan American Games
Medalists at the 2015 Pan American Games
Medalists at the 2011 Pan American Games
People from Nueva Gerona